Lisvane (CAC) Tennis Club, also known as the Cardiff Tennis Club, is a tennis club based in Lisvane, Cardiff, Wales. Lisvane Tennis Club amalgamated with the tennis section of Cardiff Athletic Club in 2003 to form the Lisvane (CAC) Tennis Club. It has its headquarters at Cardiff Arms Park.

History

Tennis was first played on Cardiff Arms Park in 1867. The tennis and bowls sections joined with the existing rugby and cricket sections of CAC in the mid-twenties. Ladies Hockey, Baseball and Golf sections joined the CAC in the thirties and Cardiff Hockey Club joined the CAC after World War II. The Tennis section along with the cricket section moved to Sophia Gardens in 1966, and after the Sophia Gardens ground was sold to Glamorgan County Cricket Club in 1998. The tennis section then had no fixed site until in 2003 they amalgamated with Lisvane Tennis Club and moved to a new permanent location in 2003 and became Lisvane (CAC) Tennis Club. Lisvane (CAC) Tennis Club forms the tennis section of Cardiff Athletic Club.

Facilities

In April 2004, Lisvane (CAC) Tennis Club built of a new clubhouse, opened by the then Cardiff Athletic Club President, Bleddyn Williams. The club has five floodlit all-weather tennis courts which are up to LTA standards.

See also
Sport in Cardiff

Notes

External links
Cardiff Athletic Club – Tennis section
Official website of Lisvane (CAC) Tennis Club

Sport in Cardiff
Organisations based in Cardiff